Masaka Regional Referral Hospital, commonly known as Masaka Hospital is a hospital in the city of Masaka, in south-central Uganda. It is the referral hospital for the districts of Kalangala District, Lyantonde, Masaka and Sembabule, Kalungu, Lwengo, Bukomansimbi and Rakai.

Location

The coordinates of Masaka Regional Referral Hospital are: 0°19'46.0"S, 31°44'04.0"E (Latitude:-0.329444; Longitude:31.734444).

Overview
Masaka Hospital is a public hospital, funded by the Uganda Ministry of Health and general care in the hospital is free. It is one of the 13 Regional Referral Hospitals in Uganda. The hospital is designated as one of the 15 Internship Hospitals in Uganda where graduates of Ugandan medical schools can serve one year of internship under the supervision of qualified specialists and consultants. The official bed capacity of Masaka Hospital is quoted as 330, but often twice that number or more is accommodated. The hospital averages about 450 daily admissions.

Recent developments
In June 2014, works began at the hospital for the construction of a hospital tower to house maternity and pediatric units with a total bed capacity of 400 inpatients. The work was contracted to Tirupati Development Uganda Limited, and is expected to last about 24 months. Construction of the five story hospital extension is fully funded by the Government of Uganda.

See also
Hospitals in Uganda

References

External links
  Masaka District Internet Portal
 Uganda, Pakistan To Set Up A Diagnostic Centre At Masaka Hospital

Hospitals in Uganda
Masaka District
1929 establishments in Uganda
Masaka
Central Region, Uganda
Teaching hospitals in Uganda
Hospitals established in 1929